Dutch folk dance are the traditional dances that were performed by the folk.

Foreigners and the Dutch, alike, associate Dutch folk dance with clog dancing, though clogs in practice limit the dance moves. Therefore, the folk dance is mostly danced in shoes. Historically the Dutch danced in shoes as this was part of their Church going clothing. Clogs were used for work only. On harvest feasts the farmers often did dance on clogs though, as the feast followed the harvest, where they had been wearing clogs.

In the East of the Netherlands dances like Driekusman, Hoksebarger, Veleta, Kruispolka and the Spaanse Wals share the origin with German dances, but some are even danced in countries further away, like Poland and Lithuania. Or at least using the same melodies. The actual dances may differ. The "Veleta" used to be a common dance in many parts of the Netherlands during the 1950s till the 1970s on weddings and even in dancings, just like the ballroom dances Waltz, Quickstep and Tango.

Nowadays, new folk dances are still being created. It concerns new dance moves (patterns) that borrow from the traditional dances.

Folk dances are not often danced anymore. Some old-fashioned farmer weddings still feature them, and in old people homes the dances are used as exercise. Nevertheless, there are quite a few folk dance groups still performing Dutch folk dances. There are two kinds of folk dance groups in the Netherlands: those who want to preserve the traditional local dances, with mainly elderly dancers (50+) and there are less of these groups by time. And those who want to show Dutch folklore on stage with new choreographies based on the original material. The latter ones usually have younger dancers from the age of 8 till 50, and often go to festivals in the Netherlands and abroad

See also 
 Klompendansen

References 

Dance in the Netherlands
European folk dances
Dutch dances